Charaxes eupale, the common green charaxes, is a butterfly in the family Nymphalidae. It is found in Senegal, Guinea, Sierra Leone, Liberia, Ivory Coast, Ghana, Togo, Nigeria, Cameroon, Gabon, the Republic of the Congo, the Central African Republic, Angola, Zambia, the Democratic Republic of the Congo, Uganda, Sudan, Rwanda, Kenya, Tanzania and Malawi.

Biology
eupale is the most common forest charaxes  
The habitat consists of lowland evergreen forests.

The larvae feed on Scutia myrtina, Albizia gummifera, Albizia zygia, Albizia adianthifolia and Cathormion species.

Notes on the biology of eupale are given by Larsen, T.B. (1991) 

The green colouration is produced by pigments as opposed to being produced structurally, which is common in most green butterflies.

Description
A full description is given by Rothschild, W. And Jordan, K., 1900 Novitates Zoologicae  Volume 7:510 et seq.  (for terms see Novitates Zoologicae  Volume 5:545-601  )

Subspecies
Charaxes eupale eupale (Senegal, Guinea, Sierra Leone, Liberia, Ivory Coast, Ghana, Togo, Nigeria)
Charaxes eupale latimargo Joicey & Talbot, 1921 (south-eastern Nigeria, Cameroon, Gabon, Congo, Central African Republic, northern Angola, Democratic Republic of the Congo, southern Sudan, Uganda, Rwanda, western Kenya, north-western Tanzania)
Charaxes eupale veneris White & Grant, 1989  (Malawi, Tanzania, northern Zambia)

Similar species
Similar to Charaxes dilutus  but apical green patch darker and hind wing with a dark green margin 

Charaxes eupale is in the Charaxes eupale species group (clade) The clade members are:

Charaxes subornatus
Charaxes eupale
Charaxes dilutus
Charaxes montis
Charaxes minor 
Charaxes schiltzei 
Charaxes schultzei 
Charaxes virescens
Bouyer et al., 2008 erected the genus Viridixes Bouyer & Vingerhoedt, 2008 to accommodate species belonging to the eupale species group.

Realm
Afrotropical realm

References

Seitz, A. Die Gross-Schmetterlinge der Erde 13: Die Afrikanischen Tagfalter. Plate XIII 32
Victor Gurney Logan Van Someren, 1974 Revisional notes on African Charaxes (Lepidoptera: Nymphalidae). Part IX. Bulletin of the British Museum of Natural History (Entomology) 29 (8):415-487.

External links
African Charaxes/Charaxes Africains Eric Vingerhoedt images of eupale group
Charaxes eupale images at Bold 
Images of C. eupale latimargo Royal Museum for Central Africa (Albertine Rift Project)

Butterflies described in 1782
eupale